Das Geheimnis meiner Familie is a German television series. It is aired in Germany's Das Erste and its sister network, EinsFestival, including its localized networks such as WDR and SWR Fernsehen. It is also aired in 3sat, a network which shared by both German, Austrian and Swiss broadcasters such as ZDF, ARD, ORF and SRG SSR. It is a German adaptation of the UK TV series Who Do You Think You Are?

People featured in the series

 Christine Neubauer, 14 April 2008.

See also
List of German television series

References

External links
 

2008 German television series debuts
2008 German television series endings
German-language television shows